Pennsylvania Dutch English is a dialect of English that has been influenced by the Pennsylvania Dutch language. It is largely spoken in South Central Pennsylvania, both by people who are monolingual in English and bilingual in Pennsylvania Dutch and English. The dialect has been dying out, as non-Amish younger Pennsylvania Germans tend to speak General American English. 

Very few non-Amish members of these people can speak the Pennsylvania German language, although most know some words and phrases. The World War II generation of the mid-20th century was the last generation in which Pennsylvania Dutch was widely spoken outside the Amish and Old Order Mennonite communities.

Features of Pennsylvania German influence

Pennsylvania Dutch English differs from standard English in various ways. Some of its hallmark features include:

 Widespread devoicing of obstruents, such as “round” being pronounced “rount” or “eggs” as “ecks”.
 The use of certain vowel variants in specific phonological contexts.
 The use of Pennsylvania German verb and noun stems in word construction.
 Specific intonation patterns for questions.
 Special placement of prepositional phrases in sentences (so that "Throw some hay over the fence for the horse" might be rendered "Throw the horse over the fence some hay").
 The use of "ain't" and "not" or "say" as question tags.
 The use of "still" as a habitual verbal marker.
 The use of the phrase "what for" to mean "what kind of." (German = "was für")
 Use of the word "yet" to mean "still," such as "do you work at the store yet?" to mean "do you still work at the store?"
 Use of terms such as "doncha know" and "so I do" or "so he does" at the end of declaratory sentences.
 Use of the word "awhile" at the end of sentences proposing simultaneous actions (e.g. "Go get the tea out of the pantry; I'll start boiling the water awhile.").
 Omitting "to be" from the passive construction in an infinitive following "needs" or "wants" (e.g. "the car needs cleaned" instead of "the car needs to be cleaned").

Other calques include:

Other idioms include "Make wet?" meaning "Is it going to rain?", "hurrieder" meaning "faster", and "dippy eggs/ecks" meaning "over-easy or soft-boiled eggs".

See also
 Lunenburg English, a dialect of Canadian English similarly influenced by German
 Northeast Pennsylvania English
 Philadelphia dialect
 North American English regional phonology
 Regional vocabularies of American English

References

External links
 
 
 

City colloquials
Dialects of English
English language in the United States
Languages of Pennsylvania
Ohio culture
Pennsylvania culture
Pennsylvania Dutch language